This is a list of guitars manufactured by the Yamaha Corporation.

List of guitars

 10 
 102 
 112 
 1212 - Dates of manufacture: 1994 - Manufacture of the 1212 began in 1994
 1221  - Dates of manufacture: 1994 - Manufacture of the 1221 began in 1994
 1221 M - Dates of manufacture: 1994 - Manufacture of the 1221 M began in 1994
 1221 M S - Dates of manufacture: 1994 - * made the first 1221 M S in 1994
 1221MS 
 1230   
 1230 S   
 1412   
 15 
 1511 
 302s 
 310 
 460S 12str 
 812 S   
 812W 
 821   
 904   
 912 J   
 A1M 
 A1R
 A3M
 A3R
 AC1M
 AC1R
 AC3M
 AC3R
 AE 11
 AE 1200 S   
 AE 500  
 AE1200 
 AE18 
 AE2000 
 AE2000S 
 AE500 
 AES 1500   
 AES 1500 B   
 AES 1500 B (New)   
 AES 420   
 AES 500   
 AES 520   
 AES 620 
 AES 620   
 AES 620HB   
 AES 720   
 AES 800   
 AES 800 B   
 AES 920   
 AES AD6 AMIR DERAKH SIGNATURE   
 AES FRANK GAMBALE SIGNATURE MODEL   
 AES RS7 RYAN SHUCK SIGNATURE   
 AES1500 
 AES1500-B 
 AES420 
 AES500 
 AES620 
 AES620HB 
 AES620SH 
 AES630 
 AES720 
 AES800 
 AES800-B Bigsby 
 AES820 
 AES820D6
 AES920 
 AES-FG Frank Gambale Signature Guitar 
 AEX 1500 
 AEX 1500   
 AEX 1500 CURRENT MODELS   
 AEX 500   
 AEX 500 N(2)   
 AEX 502   
 AEX 520 
 AEX 520   
 AEX-500 
 AEX-500N 
 AEX-500N2 
 AEX-500S 
 AEX-502 
 APX 4A 
 APX 6A 
 APX 700 12 NT 
 APX 700II 12
 APX SPL I 
 APX SPL II 
 APX-10 
 APX-20C 
 APX-3 
 APX-4ASPL
 APX-4-12 
 APX-5 
 APX-5 CBS 
 APX-5A
 APX-5-12A 
 APX-5NA 
 APX-6 
 APX-6LA 
 APX-6NA 
 APX-7A 
 APX-7C 
 APX-8 
 APX-8-12C
 APX-9-12 
 APX-9C 
 APX-9N
 APX-9NA 
 AS800 
 C40 Classical. 
 C45 
 C80 
 CD-110CE 
 CG-100 
 CG-100 A 
 CG-101 
 CG-110 
 CG111C
 CG-111S 
 CG-120-A 
 CG-130-A 
 CG-150CA 
 CG-150CCA 
 CG-150CCE 
 CG-150S 
 CG-150SA 
 CG-151C 
 CG-151S 
 CG-170CA 
 CG-170SA 
 CG-171S 
 CG-171SF 
 CG-180S 
 CG-180SA 
 CG-201S 
 CG-510CA 
 CG-60A
 CG-90-MA 
 CGX-101 
 CGX-111SC 
 CGX-171CC Classical Guitar 
 CGX171CCA 
 CGX-171SCF 
 CJ-12 
 CJ-818 
 CJ-838S 
 CJX-12S 
 CLASSIC   
 CN525E 
 CPX10 
 CPX15 
 CPX15A 
 CPX15AD 
 CPX15CM 
 CPX15E 
 CPX15S 
 CPX15W Compass West 
 CPX5 
 CPX700-12 NT
 CPX700II-12
 CPX8 
 CPX8-12 12-String 
 CPX8-SY 
 CPX900 
 CPXW 
 CSF-35 
 CSF-60 
 CUSTOM   
 CV820WB Wes Borland Signature 
 D120 
 DW-20
 DW-4S 
 DW-4S-12 
 DW-4SC
 DW-4T
 DW-5S 
 DW-6 
 DW-7
 DW-8 
 DW7-12
 DW15 
 DWX-7C ABS 
 DWX-8C 
 Dynamic Guitar No. 15 
 Dynamic Guitar No. 20
 EC-10 Eterna
 EC-12 Eterna
 EF-10 
 EF-15 Eterna 
 EF-35 Eterna 
 EG-012 
 EG-112 
 EG-112C 
 EG-303 
 EGK-300 
 ERG-121
 ERG-121C
 ET112 
 EZ-AG 
 EZ-EG 
 F-210 
 F-310 
 F-310PKG 
 F-325 
 F-335 
 F-340 
 F-340BL
 F-35P 
 F-360 
 F-36S
 F-370 
 FD01S 
 FD-02 
 FG Junior 
 FG-04LTD 
 FG-1000 
 FG-110
 FG-110-1
 FG-110E 
 FG-122 
 FG-140 
 FG-150 
 FG-1500 
 FG-160 
 FG-160 
 FG-160-1BK Special Edition 
 FG-160E 
 FG-170 
 FG-180 
 FG-200 
 FG-2000 
 FG-230 
 FG2500
 FG-260 
 FG295S 
 FG-300 
 FG-312 
 FG-325 
 FG-330 
 FG-331 
 FG335 
 FG-335E 
 FG-335II 
 FG-336SB
 FG-340 
 FG-345 
 FG-350 
 FG-350D
 FG350F 
 FG-350W 
 FG-351SB 
 FG-360 
 FG-365 
 FG-365S 
 FG-365SII 
 FG-375S 
 FG-375SII 
 FG-400 
 FG-400A 
 FG-401 
 FG-402 
 FG-402MS 
 FG-403S 
 FG-410A
 FG-410EA 
 FG-411 
 FG-411 12 
 FG-411C-12 
 FG-411CE 
 FG-411-SC 
 FG-411SCE 
 FG-412 12 string 
 FG-412 BL 
 FG-412L 
 FG-412S 
 FG-412SB 12-String
 FG-413S 
 FG-413S 12-String 
 FG-420 
 FG-420-12 
 FG-420-12A 
 FG-420CE 
 FG-420E-12 
 FG-420E-12A 
 FG-422 OBB 
 FG-423S 
 FG-430 
 FG-432S 
 FG-433S 
 FG-435 
 FG-435A 
 FG-440 
 FG-441S 
 FG-450S
 FG-450SA 
 FG-460S 
 FG-460F-12 
 FG-460-SA 
 FG-461S 
 FG-465 
 FG-470S 
 FG-480S 
 FG-502 
 FG-502M 
 FG-512 12-String 
 FG-512II 
 FG-580 
 FG-612S 12-String
 FG-700 
 FG700S 
 Fg700S 
 FG-720S 12-string 
 FG-730S 
 FG-75 
 FG-750S 
 FG-75-1 
 FG-830
 FGB1 
 FGS-345 
 FGX-04 LTD 
 FGX-412
 FGX-412C-12
 FGX-412C-12 BL 
 FGX-412C 
 FGX-412C-MAB 
 FGX-412S 
 FGX-412SC 
 FGX-413SC 
 FGX-413SC-12
 FGX-423SC-12 BL
 FGX720SCA 
 FGX-B1 
 FJ-645 
 FJ-681 Jumbo 
 FN-575E
 FPX-300
 FS-100C 
 FS-310 
 FS-350S 
 FS-413S 
 FS-500SJ 
 FS-720S 
 FX-200
 FX-310 
 FX-335
 FX370C 
 FZ-1000 
 G10 
 G120A 
 G130A 
 G-130A 
 G170A 
 G225 Classical 
 G228 Classical 
 G231 
 G240 Classical 
 G245-S 
 G250-S 
 G255-S 
 G50 Classical Guitar 
 G50A 
 G55 Classical 
 G55A 
 G65A 
 G80-A Classical 
 G85A 
 G90-A Flamenco Classical Guitar 
 GC-15D 
 GC-3 Classical 
 GC-30 
 GC-30C 
 GC-3D Classical 
 GD-10 
 GD20-C Classical
 GL-1 
 GLX-1 
 Image Custom 
 Image Standard 
 Kyle May Signature 
 L-10A 
 L-15A Handcrafted 
 L-20A Handcrafted 
 L-25A Handcrafted 
 L-5A 
 L-8S 
 LA-8 
 LD-10 
 LD-10E 
 Les Paul Copy 
 LJ16 
 LJX6C 
 LL-11 
 LL-11E 
 LL-16 
 LL-1E 
 LL-25-12 
 LL-26 
 LL-35 
 LL36
 LL56 
 LL-400 
 LL500 
 LL500 CX 
 LL-6 
 LL-TA
 LLX-26 C 
 LLX-400
 LLX6 
 Lord Player 
 Lord Player 400 
 LS10 
 LS10T 
 LS16 
 LS400 
 LS500 
 LS-TA
 LW-5 
 MSG Custom 
 MSG Deluxe 
 MSG Standard 
 No. 120 Nippon Gakki 
 PAC 012   
 PAC 120 S   
 PAC 1511 MS MIKE STERN SIGNATURE MODEL   
 PAC 302S  
 PAC 303-12 12-STRING   
 PAC 303-12 II   
 PAC 311 MS  
 PAC 312  
 PAC 312 II  
 PAC 412  
 PAC 412V  
 PAC 604 W  
 PAC 612V  
 PAC 812 W  
 Pacific 112P 
 Pacific 312 II 
 Pacifica 012 
 Pacifica 102 
 Pacifica 102S 
 Pacifica 112 
 Pacifica 112J 
 Pacifica 112L 
 Pacifica 112M 
 Pacifica 112MX 
 Pacifica 112SX 
 Pacifica 112V 
 Pacifica 112X 
 Pacifica 112XC
 Pacifica 120 
 Pacifica 120S 
 Pacifica 120SD 
 Pacifica 1212 
 Pacifica 1221 
 Pacifica 1221M 
 Pacifica 122L 
 Pacifica 1230S 
 Pacifica 1412 
 Pacifica 1421 
 Pacifica 1511 Mike Stern 
 Pacifica 302S 
 Pacifica 303-12 12 String 
 Pacifica 311 Mike Stern
 Pacifica 311H 
 Pacifica 312 
 PACIFICA 402 S  
 Pacifica 402S 
 Pacifica 412
 Pacifica 510V 
 Pacifica 512 
 Pacifica 521 
 Pacifica 604 
 Pacifica 604W
 Pacifica 611HFM 
 Pacifica 612V 
 Pacifica 712 
 Pacifica 721 
 Pacifica 812V 
 Pacifica 812W 
 Pacifica 821D 
 Pacifica 821DX 
 Pacifica 821R 
 Pacifica 904
 Pacifica 912 
 Pacifica 921 
 PACIFICA PAC 112   
 PACIFICA PAC 112J   
 Pacifica USA 1 
 PACIFICA USA 1  
 Pacifica USA 2 
 PACIFICA USA 2  
 PC-112 
 PYO7092 MSG Standard 
 RG-110 
 RGX 120 D
 RGX 121 D (RGZ 121 P)
 RGX 121 S
 rgx 211 
 RGX 220 DZ 
 RGX 320 FZ 
 RGX 320FZ
 RGX 420 S
 RGX 420 SD6 (Drop 6)
 RGX 421 D
 RGX 520FZ
 RGX 621 D (RGZ 621 P)
 RGX 820 R
 RGX 821 (821D)
 RGX Custom 
 RGX Standard 
 RGX-110 
 RGX-112 
 RGX-112P 
 RGX-1200 
 RGX-120D 
 RGX-1212S 
 RGX-121D 
 RGX-121DM 
 RGX-121S 
 RGX-121Z 
 RGX-1220A 
 RGX-1220S 
 RGX-1221S 
 RGX-211M 
 RGX-220 
 RGX-312 
 RGX-320FZ 
 RGX-321D 
 RGX-321FP 
 RGX-321FP-R 
 RGX-420 D6
 RGX-420S 
 RGX-420S 
 RGX-421 Pro 
 RGX-421 Pro 
 RGX-421D 
 RGX-421D 
 RGX-421DM 
 RGX-421DM 
 RGX-421DZ 
 RGX-421DZ 
 RGX-512J 
 RGX-512J 
 RGX-520DZ 
 RGX-520DZ 
 RGX-520FZ 
 RGX-520FZ 
 RGX-521 
 RGX-521 
 RGX-603a 
 RGX-603S 
 RGX-610M 
 RGX-610M 
 RGX-612 
 RGX-612 
 RGX-612A 
 RGX-612A 
 RGX-612S 
 RGX-612S 
 RGX-620S 
 RGX-620S 
 RGX-620Z 
 RGX-620Z 
 RGX-621D 
 RGX-621D 
 RGX-721DG 
 RGX-721DG 
 RGX-820DZ 
 RGX-820DZ 
 RGX-820R 
 RGX-820R 
 RGX-820Z 
 RGX-820Z 
 RGX-821D 
 RGX-821D 
 RGX-A2 
 RGX-A2 
 RGX-TT 
 RGX-TT 
 RGXTT TY TABOR SIGNATURE MODEL
 RGXTTD6 (Drop 6) Ty Tabor Signature Model
 RGZ 112P
 RGZ 321P
 RGZ 611M
 RGZ 612P
 RGZ 612PL
 RGZ Custom 
 RGZ Custom 
 RGZ-112P 
 RGZ-112P 
 RGZ-211M 
 RGZ-211M 
 RGZ-321P 
 RGZ-321P 
 RGZ-621 
 RGZ-621 
 RGZ-820R
 RGZ-820R
 S-50 a
 SA 1100  
 SA 2000  
 SA 2100
 SA 2200
 SA 500
 SA 800
 SA 900 
 SA1100 
 SA1200S 
 SA15 
 SA2000 
 SA2000s 
 SA2100 
 SA2200 
 SA30 
 SA30T 
 SA500 
 SA503 TVL 
 SA503TVL 
 SA-5
 SA50B 
 SA700 
 SA800 
 SAS1500 
 SAS-1500 
 SBG 1000
 SBG 2000
 SBG 3000
 SBG 500
 SBG 500 B
 SBG 700 S
 SBG1000 
 SBG1200 
 SBG1300TS 
 SBG200 
 SBG2000 
 SBG2100 
 SBG300 
 SBG3000 
 SBG500 
 SBG500B 
 SBG700S 
 SC 400
 SC 600
 SC-1000
 SC-1200 
 SC-300T 
 SC-400 
 SC-700 
 SC-800 
 SE110 
 SE1203A
 SE1212 
 SE150 
 SE200 
 SE203 
 SE211 
 SE250 
 SE300 
 SE300H 
 SE312
 SE312M
 SE350 
 SE350H 
 SE450
 SE603M 
 SE612 
 SE612A 
 SE700E 
 SE700HE 
 SE700M 
 SE903A 
 SF1000 SuperFlighter 
 SF500 SuperFlighter 
 SF600
 SF700 
 SG 500B 
 SG 700S 
 SG1000 
 SG1000S 
 SG-12 
 SG1200S 
 SG1300T 
 SG1500 
 SG1500S 
 SG1996 
 SG2
 SG-20
 SG200 
 SG2000 
 SG2000S 
 SG2100S 
 SG3 
 SG-30 
 SG300
 SG3000S 
 SG-3C
 SG-40S
 SG400 
 SG-450
 SG-45 
 SG-5
 SG-50 
 SG500
 SG500T
 SG5A 
 SG600 
 SG-60T 
 SG-7 
 SG-70 
 SG700 
 SG700S 
 SG-7A
 SG-80T
 SG800 
 SG85 
 SGV 300
 SGV 500
 SGV 700 (Japan only)
 SGV 800
 SGV 1200 (Japan only)
 SGV Blue Jeans
 SH-01 Shouter 
 SHB 400
 SHB400
 SJ-400S
 SJ 550 HR 
 SJ-180 
 SJ-500 
 SJ-550HM 
 SJ-800 
 SL700C 
 SLG100N Silent Guitar 
 SLG100S Silent Guitar 
 SLG130NW Silent Guitar 
 SLG200N Silent Guitar (nylon string)
 SLG200S Silent Guitar (steel string)
 SLG200NW
 SPECIAL
 SR-500
 SSC 500
 SSC-500 
 Studio Lord 
 Studio Lord 380SL 
 Studio Lord 450SL 
 Studio Lord 600 
 Studio Lord SL500 
 Studio Lord SL800S 
 Super RocknRoller 400 
 Super Roknroller 500 
 Super Roknroller 700 
 Weddington Classic 
 Weddington Custom 
 Weddington Special 
 X-40 
 YGF-410-12 
 YSG

See also
 Yamaha electric guitar models
 List of Yamaha signature instruments
 Superstrat

References

External links

 List of Yamaha guitars